National Secondary Route 174, or just Route 174 (or ) is a National Road Route of Costa Rica, located in the San José province.

Description
In San José province the route covers San José canton (Pavas district).

References

Highways in Costa Rica